Pedro Paulo Requena Cisneros (born 24 January 1991) is a Peruvian professional footballer who plays as a right defender for Universidad César Vallejo in the Peruvian Segunda División

References

External links
 
 

1991 births
Living people
Footballers from Lima
Peruvian footballers
Peru international footballers
Association football defenders
Total Chalaco footballers
Club Deportivo Universidad César Vallejo footballers
Peruvian Primera División players
2015 Copa América players